Scalextric is a 1987 racing video game developed by Leisure Genius, based on the Scalextric slot car racing toys.

Gameplay
Scalextric has horizontal split-screen and features seventeen circuits to race on.

Development
Scalextric  was published by Leisure Genius.

Reception

Scalextric received mixed to positive reviews from video game critics.

References

External links
 

1987 video games
Amstrad CPC games
Commodore 64 games
Leisure Genius games
Multiplayer and single-player video games
Racing video games
Video games developed in the United Kingdom
ZX Spectrum games